Hemphill County is a county located in the U.S. state of Texas. As of the 2020 census, its population was 3,382. The county seat and only incorporated community in the county is the city of Canadian. The county was created in 1876 and organized in 1887. It is named for John Hemphill, a judge and Confederate congressman. Hemphill County is one of five remaining prohibition, or entirely dry, counties in the state of Texas.

History

Early history
For the 200 years leading up to 1875, nomadic Indian tribes representing the Apache, Comanche, Kiowa, and others roamed the Panhandle following the huge bison (buffalo) herds. In search for an alternate route to California through Santa Fe, New Mexico, Josiah Gregg (1840), and Captain Randolph B. Marcy (1845) surveyed trails that crossed Hemphill County, following the south bank of the Canadian River.

The 1874–75 Red River War was an effort by the United States Army to force the Indians of the Southern Plains to move to Indian Territory in present-day Oklahoma. Two major battles took place in what would become Hemphill County: the Battle of Lyman's Wagon Train and the Battle of Buffalo Wallow.

On April 12, 1879, Wheeler County became the first organized county in the Panhandle, with 14 other unorganized counties attached to it, one of which was Hemphill County. Hemphill County was organized in July 1887.

Influence of Santa Fe Railroad
In 1886, the Southern Kansas Railway Company, a Santa Fe subsidiary, began to build a rail line into the Panhandle of Texas. The tracks entered Hemphill County during 1887 and further encouraged settlement in the area, creating three town sites: Mendota, Canadian, and Glazier.

In 1907, Canadian was designated a division point by the Santa Fe, a factor which brought diversification to the previously ranching economy of the area. The Santa Fe influence  remained very strong until the mid-1950s, when the railway moved its employees to Amarillo.

Meanwhile, Hemphill County was roughly the midway point of two smaller lines, the Clinton and Oklahoma Western Railroad  Company and the Clinton-Oklahoma-Western Railroad Company of Texas.

Oil production
During the 1970s, the county grew due to a rapid expansion of oil production. Though oil was discovered in the county in 1955, production remained relatively small because the technology had not yet progressed to efficiently capture the very deep reserves known to exist.

Geography

Major highways
  U.S. Highway 60
  U.S. Highway 83
  State Highway 33

Adjacent counties
 Lipscomb County (north)
 Ellis County, Oklahoma (northeast)
 Roger Mills County, Oklahoma (southeast)
 Wheeler County (south)
 Roberts County (west)
 Gray County (southwest)

National protected area
 Black Kettle National Grassland (part)

Demographics

Note: the US Census treats Hispanic/Latino as an ethnic category. This table excludes Latinos from the racial categories and assigns them to a separate category. Hispanics/Latinos can be of any race.

As of the census of 2000, 3,351 people, 1,280 households, and 948 families resided in the county.  The population density was four people per square mile (1/km2).  The 1,548 housing units averaged two per square mile (1/km2).  The racial makeup of the county was 87.65% White, 1.55% Black or African American, 0.72% Native American, 0.27% Asian, 0.03% Pacific Islander, 8.48% from other races, and 1.31% from two or more races.  About 15.6% of the population were Hispanic or Latino of any race.

Of the 1,280 households, 32.70% had children under the age of 18 living with them, 65.20% were married couples living together, 5.90% had a female householder with no husband present, and 25.90% were not families. About 24.40% of all households were made up of individuals, and 12.00% had someone living alone who was 65 years of age or older.  The average household size was 2.50 and the average family size was 2.98.

In the county, the population was distributed as 28.00% under the age of 18, 6.50% from 18 to 24, 25.30% from 25 to 44, 25.40% from 45 to 64, and 14.70% who were 65 years of age or older.  The median age was 39 years. For every 100 females, there were 101.30 males.  For every 100 females age 18 and over, there were 92.20 males.

The median income for a household in the county was $35,456, and for a family was $42,036. Males had a median income of $31,154 versus $19,423 for females. The per capita income for the county was $16,929.  About 10.90% of families and 12.60% of the population were below the poverty line, including 16.70% of those under age 18 and 12.80% of those age 65 or over.

Communities
 Canadian (county seat)
 Glazier

Politics

See also

 Dry counties
 List of museums in the Texas Panhandle
 National Register of Historic Places listings in Hemphill County, Texas
 Recorded Texas Historic Landmarks in Hemphill County

References

External links
 
 Canadian Chamber of Commerce
 Hemphill County Profile from the Texas Association of Counties 
 River Valley Pioneer Museum
 The Citadelle Art Foundation
 Canadian Independent School District
 The Canadian Record

 
1887 establishments in Texas
Populated places established in 1887
Texas Panhandle